The Himachal Pradesh cricket team is a domestic cricket team based in the Indian state of Himachal Pradesh. It has competed in the Ranji Trophy since the 1985–86 season. They have won their first ever domestic trophy, by winning the 2021–22 edition of Vijay Hazare Trophy.

Playing history
Himachal Pradesh lost all five of their matches in both 1985–86 and 1987–88 seasons by an innings. They won for the first time when they beat Services by one wicket in 1990–91. In 2006–07 Himachal Pradesh won the Plate Group of the Ranji Trophy, beating Orissa in the final after finishing top of their group.

After the 2018–19 season Himachal Pradesh had played 202 Ranji Trophy matches with 37 wins, 86 losses and 79 draws.

Most of Himachal Pradesh's home games are played at the Himachal Pradesh Cricket Association Stadium in Dharamshala.

In the 2016–17 Ranji Trophy, Himachal Pradesh recorded their lowest total in the competition when they were bowled out for 36 runs against Hyderabad on 28 October 2016.

Himachal Pradesh's best finishes in Syed Mushtaq Ali Trophy were in 2009–10 and 2020–21, when they reached quarterfinals and lost to Tamil Nadu on both the occasions. They won their maiden title in 2021–22 Vijay Hazare Trophy defeating Tamil Nadu in final.

Current squad

Players with international caps are listed in bold.

Updated as on 24 January 2023

References

External links
Cricinfo's Complete History of the Indian Domestic Competitions
First-class matches played by Himachal Pradesh

Indian first-class cricket teams
Cricket in Himachal Pradesh
1985 establishments in Himachal Pradesh
Cricket clubs established in 1985